Henry Dennis Paul Wise (born 1 January 2000) is a professional footballer who plays as a midfielder for New York Red Bulls II.

Career

Early career
Born in Kensington, Wise was spotted by boyhood club Queens Park Rangers and joined the clubs youth academy. After a few years with Queens Park Rangers he signed with Arsenal joining the Gunners’ Hale End academy. In 2016 he joined Derby County. Wise appeared in 24 matches with Derby County’s U-18’s in the U18 Premier League, where he scored two goals.

In November 2018, he had a trial at Queens Park Rangers. In March 2019, Wise departed Derby "by mutual agreement".

Watford
In July 2019, Wise joined Watford's under-23 side on a one-year deal. On 4 November 2019, Wise opened the scoring for Watford under-23 in a 3-0 victory over Ipswich Town's under-23 side in a Professional Development League Two clash at Clarence Park. In summer 2020, he signed a new one-year deal at the club. On 23 January 2020, Wise made his first team debut for Watford in a 2–1 FA Cup third round replay defeat against Tranmere Rovers. In summer 2020, he signed a new one-year deal at the club. He was released by Watford at the end of the 2021–22 season.

New York Red Bulls II
On 11 August 2022, Wise moved to the United States, signing with USL Championship side New York Red Bulls II. On 22 September 22, Wise made his debut for New York appearing as a starter in a 0-0 draw with Detroit City FC.

Personal life
He is the son of former player Dennis Wise.

Career statistics

Notes

References

External links
Profile at premierleague.com

Living people
2000 births
English footballers
English expatriate footballers
English expatriate sportspeople in the United States
Expatriate soccer players in the United States
Association football midfielders
Queens Park Rangers F.C. players
Arsenal F.C. players
Derby County F.C. players
Watford F.C. players
New York Red Bulls II players